Kadungalloor, is a village situated near Aluva. The village belongs to the Paravur Taluk of the Ernakulam district in the Indian state of Kerala. The industrial estates of Muppathadam and Edayar are located in Kadungalloor.

Demographics
According to 2001 census data, Kadungalloor has a population of 35,451, evenly distributed between men and women. The average literacy rate is 81%, which is above the national average of 59.5%. About 13% of the population is below the age of 7. According to reports, there are 10,125 houses situated in Kadungalloor.

Transport 

Landmarks and attractions 
The Kadungalloor Panchayat is divided into East Kadungalloor and West Kadungalloor. 

The temple at Uliyannoor is believed to be built by Perumthachan. Sree Narasimha Swami Temple is the largest temple situated in Kadungalloor. Many devotees visit the temple for its famous paal payasam (a sweet drink prepared with milk and rice) and an annual festival. 

St.John The Apostle Church, First Church in India with St.John The Apostle as Patron Saint. On Church Feast many devotees visit church.

Industries

The following industrial units are present in Kadungalloor:

Cochin_Minerals_and_Rutile_Limited Ltd. (C.M.R.L)
 Indo-German Karbon
 Periyar Forms

Religious Places

There are around 21 temples, 9 mosques, 3 churches in are located in this panchayat, including but not limited to:

 Sree Narasimha Swamy Temple, East Kadungalloor
 Kunnil Sree Dharmasastha temple, West Kadungalloor
 Muppathadam Kainikkara Sreekrishna Swami Temple
 Sri Chattukulathappan Siva Temple.
 Bhuvaneswari Temple
 Rudhiramala Bhagavathy Temple West Kadungalloor
 Theakumkavu Bhagavathi Temple, Elapilly Mana, East Kadungalloor
 Elookkara Pulloorppilly Kavu Temple
 St.Sebastian Church, Elookkara
 Kadungalloor Juma Masjid
 St. John The Apostle Church, Muppathadam  
 Holy Angels Church, Muppathadam 
 Muppathadam Muthukad bhagavathy Temple
 Muppathadom Parayanat Bhagavathy Temple
 Muppathadam  Sree Subrahmanya Swami Temple
 Muppathadam chandrasekharapuram Siva Temple
 Muppathadam Kaambillil Sree Dharmasastha Temple
 Muppathadam chittukunnil Hariharapura Temple
 Muppathadam kannoth Sreekrishna Swami Temple
 Kayantikkara Bhagavathy Temple

Education

The educational institutions located here include:
 Muppathadam HSS
 Govt. HS West Kadungalloor 
 Govt. LP School, East kadungalloor
 UP School, West Kadungalloor
 UP School, Uliyannoor
 St.John's Visitation Public School, Muppathadam
 Rajasree S.M.M School

Godowns

Considering the proximity to the Vallarpadom Port and Cochin International Airport, there has been a surge in the number of godowns built in the area.

See also
 Paravur Taluk
 Ernakulam district

References

External links 

 Cities and towns in Ernakulam district